The 2007–08 Siena Saints men's basketball team represented Siena College in the 2007–08 college basketball season. This was head coach Fran McCaffery's third season at Siena. The Saints competed in the Metro Atlantic Athletic Conference and played their home games at Times Union Center. They finished the season 23–11, 13–5 in MAAC play to capture the regular season championship. They also won the 2008 MAAC men's basketball tournament to earn the conference's automatic bid to the NCAA tournament as No. 13 seed in the Midwest Region. After an opening round upset of No. 4 seed Vanderbilt, the Saints lost to No. 12 seed Villanova in the second round.

Roster

Schedule and results
Source
All times are Eastern

|-
!colspan=9 style=| Regular season

|-
!colspan=10 style=| MAAC tournament

|-
!colspan=10 style=| NCAA tournament

References

Siena
Siena Saints men's basketball seasons
Siena
Siena Saints men's basketball
Siena Saints men's basketball